Charles Duane Sands (December 17, 1947 – August 22, 2016) was an American professional baseball player. He played in Major League Baseball as a catcher, pinch hitter and designated hitter for the New York Yankees (1967), Pittsburgh Pirates (1971–72), California Angels (1973–74) and Oakland Athletics (1975).

Sands was a member of the Pirates' 1971 National League and World Series champions, and batted one time in the Fall Classic, pinch hitting for Bob Veale in the sixth inning of Game 2 and striking out against eventual Hall of Famer Jim Palmer.

Over six seasons he played in 93 Games and had 145 At Bats, 15 Runs, 31 Hits, 6 Doubles, 1 Triple, 6 Home Runs, 23 RBI, 36 Walks, .214 Batting Average, .372 On-base percentage, .393 Slugging Percentage, 57 Total Bases, 1 Sacrifice Fly and 4 Intentional Walks. He died on August 22, 2016 at the age of 68.

References

External links

1947 births
2016 deaths
Major League Baseball catchers
Major League Baseball designated hitters
Baseball players from Virginia
New York Yankees players
Pittsburgh Pirates players
California Angels players
Oakland Athletics players
Águilas Cibaeñas players
American expatriate baseball players in the Dominican Republic
Charleston Charlies players
Salt Lake City Angels players
Toledo Mud Hens players
Manchester Yankees players
Kinston Eagles players
Syracuse Chiefs players
Miami Marlins (FSL) players
Tucson Toros players
Águilas de Mexicali players
American expatriate baseball players in Mexico
Sportspeople from Newport News, Virginia
Morehead State University alumni